Ulla Håkanson (also Håkansson, born 9 November 1937) is a Swedish equestrian. She won a bronze medal in dressage at the 1972 and 1984 Summer Olympics.

Håkanson started competing in show jumping and won the national titles in 1966 and 1967. At one competition, her horse Ajax got injured, and Håkanson switched from jumping to dressage, starting a long and successful career in this event: between 1970 and 2002 she won twelve gold, five silver and five bronze medals at the national championships. Internationally, she won team bronze medals at European championships in 1971 and 1997, at world championships in 1998, and at Olympic Games in 1972 and 1984. Individually she placed 6th in 1972, 12th in 1984, 11th in 1988 and 20th in 1996. She skipped the 1976 Games because Ajax died shortly before the competition, and at the 2000 Olympics she was part of the Swedish reserve. In 1971 she was awarded the Swedish Equestrian Medal of Honor and in 1988 she received a royal medal for her sports achievements.

References

External links

1937 births
Living people
Swedish female equestrians
Swedish dressage riders
Olympic equestrians of Sweden
Olympic bronze medalists for Sweden
Equestrians at the 1972 Summer Olympics
Equestrians at the 1984 Summer Olympics
Equestrians at the 1988 Summer Olympics
Equestrians at the 1996 Summer Olympics
Olympic medalists in equestrian
Medalists at the 1984 Summer Olympics
Medalists at the 1972 Summer Olympics